Paul Lee may refer to:

 Paul Lee (artist) (born 1974), British artist based in New York
 Paul Lee (basketball) (born 1989), Filipino basketball player
 Paul Lee (Canadian entrepreneur), video game developer, venture capitalist, businessman and entrepreneur
 Paul Lee (speedway rider) (born 1981), motorcycle speedway rider
 Paul Lee (television executive), British television executive, head of the US television network ABC
 Paul Sun-Hyung Lee (born 1972), Korean Canadian actor
 Paul Anthony Lee (born 1946), British lawyer and businessman
 Paul Lee (footballer) (born 1952), English professional footballer
 Paul Lee (soccer) (born 1961), Canadian international soccer player
 Paul Lee or Lee Bo (born 1950), see Causeway Bay Books disappearances
 Paul Lee, an American professional wrestler known for copying Ric Flair's theme, gimmick, and more

See also